Telikeda Bolli is a 2012 Tulu comedy film directed by P. H. Vishwanath and written by Devadas Kapikad. The film stars Arjun Kapikad and Ashrita Shetty in the lead roles along with Devadas Kapikad Naveen D Padil, Aravind Bolar, Gopinath Bhat, Bhojaraj Vamanjoor, and Karnoor Mohan Rai.  The movie, produced by Sudhir Kamath and Sharmila Kapikad under the banner of Central Cinemas, is released simultaneously at Mangalore, Udupi, Karkala, Belthangady and Moodabidri on 6 December 2012.

Cast
 Arjun Kapikad
 Ashrita Shetty
 Devadas Kapikad
 Naveen D Padil
 Aravind Bolar
 Gopinath Bhat
 Bhojaraj Vamanjoor
 Sandeep Shetty

Soundtrack
The soundtracks of the film were composed by Gurukiran.

References